The 1962 BYU Cougars football team represented Brigham Young University (BYU) as a member of the Western Athletic Conference (WAC) during the 1962 NCAA University Division football season. In their second season under head coach Hal Mitchell, the Cougars compiled an overall record of 4–6 with a mark of 2–2 against conference opponents, tied for second place in the WAC, and outscored opponents by a combined total of 197 to 170.

The team's statistical leaders included Eldon Fortie with 814 passing yards, 1,149 rushing yards, 1,963 yards of total offense, and 86 points scored, Bruce Smith with 230 receiving yards, and Gene Frantz with nine interceptions.

Schedule

References

BYU
BYU Cougars football seasons
BYU Cougars football